Danny Groulx (born March 27, 1990) is a former Canadian football offensive lineman of the Canadian Football League (CFL). He previously attended Laval University, where he played college football for the Laval Rouge et Or.

Early career 
Groulx played hockey from 7 to 14 years before changing to football. He played high school football at École secondaire de la Montée and played for the cougars of the Champlain College Lennoxville. From 2010 to 2014, Groulx played for the Laval Rouge et Or. He was on the 2012 and 2013 Rouge et Or teams that won the Vanier Cup. In his senior year, Groulx played in only four games, playing three at left tackle and one at right tackle. He missed multiple games due to an ankle injury. Despite this, he played in the 2014 East-West Bowl on Team East.

Professional career 
Groulx attended National Football League (NFL) regional and superregional combines and was eligible for the 2015 NFL Draft, but went undrafted. Groulx attended a rookie mini-camp with the New York Giants of the NFL. He also attended the national CFL Combine in Toronto. He was among the top draft prospects in the CFL for 2015, being ranked 4th in September, 8th in December, and 5th in the final rankings by the CFL Scouting Bureau. Groulx was selected in the first round of the 2015 CFL Draft by the Edmonton Eskimos with the 7th overall pick. The Eskimos signed him to a contract on May 28, and he remained on the active roster on the offensive line after the preseason. Groulx made his CFL debut in the season opener against the Toronto Argonauts on June 27, 2015. He played the first two games of his rookie season as a right guard and went on to play ten games that season.

References

1990 births
Living people
Canadian football offensive linemen
Edmonton Elks players
Laval Rouge et Or football players
Players of Canadian football from Quebec
Sportspeople from Gatineau